Han Ji-min (born November 5, 1982) is a South Korean actress. After minor roles in All In and Dae Jang Geum, Han had her breakout role in revenge series Resurrection in 2005. This was followed by leading roles in period dramas Capital Scandal and Yi San, contemporary dramas Cain and Abel and Padam Padam, romantic dramas Rooftop Prince, Familiar Wife, and The Light in Your Eyes, as well as drama film Miss Baek, for which she was named the Best Actress at the 55th Baeksang Arts Awards. In 2022, Han starred in an omnibus-format series Our Blues.

Career

2003–2010: Beginnings and breakthrough
Han Ji-min started her career in show business while still a high school student. She made various commercial films (CF) and music videos before gaining wider attention in 2003, when she appeared in hit Korean television dramas All In and Dae Jang Geum. Han said she hadn't dreamed of becoming a serious actress, but changed her mind after starring in All In, where she played the teenage counterpart of the drama's main character, played by popular actress Song Hye-kyo.

Han achieved breakthrough with her performance in the critically acclaimed mania drama Resurrection in 2005. She then challenged herself by playing a cute yet ambitious tomboy who dreams of becoming a pilot in her first movie Blue Swallow.

A car accident on the set of Wolf seriously injured Han and her co-star Eric Mun, causing the drama to be delayed repeatedly until the decision was finally made to discontinue it with only three episodes aired. After a long recovery for Mun, the two actors reunited instead in the drama Super Rookie Ranger (also known as Invincible Parachute Agent or Korea Secret Agency).

Han continued to act in TV dramas, with memorable turns as a straitlaced resistance fighter in Capital Scandal and a royal concubine in the historical drama Yi San. Known for her sweet, innocent and fragile image and her depictions of good girls, Han surprised audiences with her performance as a sexy femme fatale in Detective K: Secret of the Virtuous Widow.

2011–2017: Diverse genres
Han played a cynical veterinarian in Padam Padam, written by famous drama writer Noh Hee-kyung, which aired on newly launched cable channel jTBC. She then starred in Rooftop Prince, about a Joseon-era prince who time-travels to the 21st century where he meets his dead beloved's doppelgänger. The popularity of Rooftop Prince garnered Han several awards, and increased her international profile, notably in Japan.

In October 2013, Han left her talent agency S.M. Entertainment's SM C&C and joined Lee Byung-hun's BH Entertainment.

In 2014, she starred in the opposites-attract romantic comedy film The Plan Man, about a methodical, mysophobic librarian who falls for a spontaneous, adventurous musician. Following that, she played the dowager Queen Jeongsun in period film The Fatal Encounter, who is the fierce political rival of her step-grandson King Jeongjo. Han next reunited with The Fatal Encounter co-star Hyun Bin in the 2015 suspense series Hyde, Jekyll, Me, in the role of a circus master who falls for a theme park owner with split personality disorder.

In 2016, Han starred in action thriller The Age of Shadows, based on the 1920s about anti-Japanese independence workers' plots and betrayals. In 2017, Han was cast in romantic short film titled Two Rays of Light alongside Park Hyung-sik.

2018–present: Critical acclaim
In 2018, Han starred in the film Miss Baek, playing the titular protagonist; an ex-convict who is emotionally closed up due to the social stigma. Han's performance in the film won her the Best Actress award at the prestigious Blue Dragon Film Awards and Baeksang Arts Awards as well as other major award ceremonies. The same year, she returned to the small screen with romance fantasy drama Familiar Wife, taking on the role of an ordinary wife with anger management issues.

In 2019, Han starred in two television series; slice of life melodrama The Light in Your Eyes and romance melodrama One Spring Night.

She then appeared in Kwak Jae-yong's romantic comedy film A Year-End Medley in 2021 and tvN television series Our Blues in 2022.

Personal life

Activism and donations 
A Social Welfare major from Seoul Women's University, Han is widely known for actively participating in volunteer work and fund drives, mostly through the relief organization Join Together Society. In 2009, she published her own book titled We’re Already Friends: Han Ji-min's Philippines Donation Book, which includes stories and drawings of her time spent in a remote mountain village in the Philippines helping at a village school. She then donated all the royalties to help in funding the education of children in North Korea and developing countries in Asia.

In 2012, she was designated as goodwill ambassador of the United Nations Environment Programme.
On March 8, 2022, Han donated  million to help Ukrainian victims in Russian invasion through the Korea Committee for UNICEF.

On May 6, 2022, Han donated  to the UN's international relief organization JTS (Join Together Society).

On June 3, 2022, Han became a member of the 'UNICEF Honors Club.

On August 11, 2022, Han donated  to the Handicapped Home to assist in the 2022 South Korean floods through the Seoul Community Chest of Korea (Seoul Fruit of Korea).

On December 24, 2022, Han donated  to help support heating costs for people at risk of disaster through the National Disaster Relief Association Hope Bridge.

On February 9, 2023, Han donated  to help 2023 Turkey–Syria earthquake through UNICEF of Korea.

Filmography

Film

Television series

Web series

Television shows

Hosting

Bibliography

Ambassadorship 
 Australian Tourism Public Relations Ambassador (2022)

Awards and nominations

State and cultural honors

Listicles

Notes

References

External links

 
 
 

South Korean television actresses
South Korean film actresses
South Korean television presenters
South Korean women television presenters
21st-century South Korean actresses
Actresses from Seoul
1982 births
Living people
Seoul Women's University alumni
Best Actress Paeksang Arts Award (film) winners